The Guelph Women's Cashspiel was a bonspiel part of the women's Ontario Curling Tour. The event was an annual event held in November and took place at the Guelph Curling Club in Guelph, Ontario.

Past Champions

Ontario Curling Tour events
Women's curling competitions in Canada
Sport in Guelph
Women in Ontario